= Keisuke Matsumoto (boxer) =

Japanese professional boxer (born 1999)

Personal information
- Nationality: Japanese
- Born: 松本圭佑; 17 July 1999 (age 26) Yokohama, Kanagawa, Japan
- Height: 5 ft 8 ½ in
- Weight: Featherweight

Boxing career
- Stance: Orthodox

Boxing record
- Total fights: 12
- Wins: 12
- Win by KO: 8

Keisuke Matsumoto (松本圭佑, Matsumoto Keisuke, born July 17, 1999) is a Japanese professional boxer. He currently competes in the featherweight division where he is the current Japan Boxing Commission Japanese Feather champion.

== Amateur career ==
Matsumoto made headlines in Japan after winning the national championships 5 years in a row. He was expected to compete for Japan at the Olympics however due to the late rise of Hayato Tsutsumi he didn't make it He finished up with a record of 80–15.

== Professional career ==
=== Matsumoto vs Sagawa ===
Matsumoto claimed the first title of his career after he beat Ryo Sagawa on points to win the Japan Boxing Commission Japnanese Feather belt. Despite being taken the distance for the first time in his career Matsumoto dominated the fight with his jab.

=== Matsumoto vs Oyekola ===
Matsumoto claimed the second title of his career after he beat Japan based Nigerian Ridwan Oyekola on points to retain his Japan Boxing Commission Japnanese Feather belt and also win the vacant WBO Asia Pacific title. Despite Oyekola finishing strongly Matsumoto held on far a wide decision win

== Professional boxing record ==
8 fights	8 wins	0 losses
By knockout	8	0

No.	Result	Record	Opponent	Type	Round, time	Date	Location	Notes
12	Win	12–0	Kimihiro Nakagawa	KO	2 (10), 2:25	17 Oct 2024	Korakuen Hall, Tokyo, Japan	Retained Japanese featherweight title
11	Win	11–0	Yushi Fujita	UD	10	25 Jun 2024	Korakuen Hall, Tokyo, Japan	Retained Japanese featherweight title
10	Win	10–0	Jinki Maeda	UD	10	22 Feb 2024	Korakuen Hall, Tokyo, Japan	Retained Japanese featherweight title
9	Win	9–0	Ridwan Oyekola	UD	12	30 Aug 2023	Korakuen Hall, Tokyo, Japan	Won vacant WBO Asia Pacific belt
8	Win	8–0	Ryo Sagawa	UD	10	18 Apr 2023	Korakuen Hall, Tokyo, Japan	Won vacant Japanese featherweight title
7	Win	7–0	Tom Hamaguchi	TKO	2 (8), 2:42	10 Jan 2023	Korakuen Hall, Tokyo, Japan	
6	Win	6–0	Ryota Ishida	TKO	2 (8), 1:43	13 Sep 2022	Korakuen Hall, Tokyo, Japan	
5	Win	5–0	Nakharin Hangyu	TKO	1 (8), 0:42	29 Jun 2022	Korakuen Hall, Tokyo, Japan	
4	Win	4–0	Takahiro Araki	TKO	5 (8), 0:46	14 Dec 2021	Kokugikan, Tokyo, Japan	
3	Win	3–0	Hiromu Murota	TKO	1 (8), 2:08	21 May 2021	Korakuen Hall, Tokyo, Japan	
2	Win	2–0	Vageta Ishikawa	TKO	1 (6), 2:26	14 Jan 2021	Korakuen Hall, Tokyo, Japan	
1	Win	1–0	Hironori Miyake	TKO	4 (6), 0:34	Aug 24 2020	Korakuen Hall, Tokyo, Japan	
